Rade Malobabić (died June 26, 1917) was a Serbian intelligence agent. He was best known for allegedly helping the Black Hand in the assassination of Archduke Franz Ferdinand, which initiated World War I.

Agram (Zagreb) Trials
Rade Malobabić was one of the high profile members of the 53 defendants tried for High Treason in Zagreb between 1907 and 1909. Rade was among 31 the found guilty and sentenced to hard labour for an extended term. The subsequent appeal being successful and the parallel Friedjung Process proving the evidence against Malobabić and his fellow defendants to have been fabricated led to the state dropping the charges and releasing all 31 remaining accused in 1910.

Military career

Malobabić was a Serbian military intelligence operative who was stationed in Austria leading up to World War I. He also worked with the Serbian deliberation group, the Black Hand, which was the group that was responsible for assassinating Archduke Franz Ferdinand.

Assassination of the Archduke

According to the final confession of Colonel Apis (which was extracted under torture and deception) Malobabić was hired by Apis to organize the assassination of the Archduke, and perform tasks such as smuggling weapons and providing information to other operatives that were a part of the killing mission. He is noteworthy as the only person accused of specific involvement in the assassinations of June 28, 1914, not to have been named by a single defendant nor by any of the counsel in the Sarajevo trial - indeed the only individual to ever link Malobabić to the murders is Apis and only then in his third and final statement on the matter 11 April 1917. In 1916 Malobabić broke after being tortured and accused Apis of plotting the whole scheme to assassinate Prince Alexander - he never admitted any involvement in Sarajevo.

Statement of Colonel Dimitrijević 11 April 1917: "As the Chief of the Intelligence Department of the General Staff, I engaged Rade Malobabic to organize the information service in Austria-Hungary. I took this step in agreement with the Russian Military Attaché Artamonov, who had a meeting with Rade in my presence. Feeling that Austria was planning a war with us, I thought that the disappearance of the Austrian Heir Apparent would weaken the power of the military clique he headed, and thus the danger of war would be removed or postponed for a while. I engaged Malobabic to organize the assassination on the occasion of the announced arrival of Franz Ferdinand to Sarajevo. I made up my mind about this only when Artamonov assured me that Russia would not leave us without protection if we were attacked by Austria. On this occasion I did not mention my intention for the assassination, and my motive for asking his opinion about Russia’s attitude was the possibility that Austria might become aware of our activities, and use this as a pretext to attack us. Malobabic executed my order, organized and performed the assassination. His chief accomplices were in my service and received small payments from me. Some of their receipts are in the hands of the Russians, since I got money for this purpose from Mr. Artamonov, as the General Staff did not have funds available for this increased activity."

Death

Apis had adopted Malobabić as his aide most probably in light of the suffering the man had incurred following his incarceration from 1907 to 1910. However, this association proved fatal for Malobabić who openly blamed Apis for his impending death as he stood awaiting execution.

In December 1916, a number of alleged members of the Black Hand Gang were arrested by the Serbian military court in exile in Salonika and tried for an alleged plot against Crown Prince Alexander of Serbia. It is commonly held that the trials were an attempt of appeasement of the Habsburg royal family and conducted in hope that the Habsburgs would declare peace with Serbia. Malobabić was named as the primary assassin, while Apis and Mohamed Mehmedbašić were among the accused. Two days before the third anniversary of Archduke's assassination, on June 26, 1917, Malobabić, Vulović and Apis were executed by firing squad. Mehmedbašić had his sentence commuted to life imprisonment. In 1953, the Serbian supreme court reviewed and repealed the judgement of the Salonika Trials and exonerated all those involved.

References

World War I
Serbian people of World War I
Assassination of Archduke Franz Ferdinand of Austria
Executed Serbian people
1917 deaths
Black Hand (Serbia)
People executed by Serbia by firing squad